Camilla More and Carey More (born 15 October 1957) are English actresses who have starred in films and on television. They are identical twin sisters. They have starred together in some films (the French film Le Jumeau directed by Yves Robert) and TV shows. The twins were born in London. They are known for their roles in the 1984 horror film Friday the 13th: The Final Chapter as Tina and Terri.

Camilla's most recent film is the 1997 film Dead Tides. Her well-known TV role was in the soap operas Days of Our Lives as Gillian Forrester from 1986 to 1987; she took over the role that her sister had played from 1987 to 1988. She has made guest appearances on TV shows such as The A-Team, Cheers, Matlock, Baywatch, and Baywatch Nights. Camilla temporarily stepped into the role of Anna Devane from 1991 to 1992, a popular character of the soap opera General Hospital which had been played by Finola Hughes

Filmography
Friday the 13th: The Final Chapter (1984) - (Camilla - Tina / Carey - Terri)
The Twin (1984) - (Camilla - Betty Kerner / Carey - Liz Kerner)
Once Bitten (1985) - (Carey - Moll Flanders Vampire)
The Serpent of Death (1989) - (Camilla - Rene)
The Dark Side of the Moon (1990) -  (Camilla - Leslie)
Dead Tides (1997) -  (Camilla - Lori)

Television
The A-Team (1983) - (Camilla - Girlfriend)
Fantasy Island (1984) - (Carey - 2nd Nurse)
Calendar Girl Murders (1984) - (Camilla)
Cheers (1985) - (Camilla - Carolyn Huxley)
Days of Our Lives (1987–88) - (Camilla - Gillian Forrester / Carey - Grace Forrester)
Maybe Baby (1988) - (Camilla - Emily)
Red Wind (1991) - (Camilla - Bonnie)
General Hospital (1991–92) - (Camilla – Anna Devane )
Matlock (1989) - (Camilla - Psychic Jennifer Holtz)
Baywatch (1995) - (Camilla - Jill Reynolds)
Baywatch Nights (1997) - (Camilla)
Mansion Hunters (2014) - (Camilla / Carey)

References

External links
 
 

1957 births
British identical twins
English film actresses
English soap opera actresses
English television actresses
Living people
Actresses from London
Identical twin actresses